The Red Ink Awards, also known as the Red Ink Awards for Excellence in Indian Journalism, are a set of annual awards given by the Mumbai Press Club in India to recognize excellence in journalistic achievements as assessed by a special jury. Instituted in 2010, the award grants national recognition to journalists by a professional body.

2013

2014

Life Time Achievement Award

Journalist Of The Year 

Sagar
Vinod Dua
Faye D’Souza
Mark Tully
Raj Kamal Jha
Ravish Kumar
Prannoy Roy 
TN Ninnan
Nikita Saxena
Kabir Agarwal
Aruna Chandrasekhar
TR Vivek
Rahul Kotiyal
Arfa Khanum Sherwani
Brajesh Rajput
Syed Shahriyar

2020
The tenth edition of the award was presented by the Chief Justice of India N. V. Ramana in a virtual event.

 Danish Siddiqui was posthumously awarded 'the Journalist of the Year' for 2020. . During the event CJI Ramana stated, "He was a man with a magical eye and was rightly regarded as one of the foremost photojournalists of this era. If a picture can tell a thousand words, his photos were novels."
 Prem Shankar Jha, 83, received lifetime achievement award "for his long and distinguished career of incisive and analytical writing".

References

External links 
 The Red Ink Awards, Mumbai Press Club

Indian journalism organisations
Indian journalism awards
2010 establishments in India